On 1 October 2022, a fatal human crush occurred following an association football match at Kanjuruhan Stadium in Malang Regency, East Java, Indonesia. Following a loss by home side Arema to rivals Persebaya Surabaya, around 3,000 Arema supporters invaded the pitch. Police said the rioting supporters attacked the players and the team officials. The police attempted to protect the players and stop the riot but the crowds clashed with the security forces. In response, riot police units deployed tear gas, which triggered a stampede of people in the stadium trying to escape from the effects of the gas. A crush formed at an exit, resulting in fans being asphyxiated. 

As of 24 October, 135 people were killed, and 583 others were injured. The disaster is the second deadliest in the history of association football worldwide, after the 1964 Estadio Nacional disaster in Peru which killed 328 people. Thus, it is the deadliest in Asia, and the Eastern Hemisphere.

On 6 October 2022, Indonesian police chief Listyo Sigit Prabowo announced six suspects: director of the match organizer PT Liga Indonesia Baru (LIB), Arema head of security officer, Arema match organising committee for negligence and three police officers for the use of tear gas.

On 16 January 2023, almost three months after the disaster, the first trial of the Kanjuruhan disaster was held. The trial held in Surabaya, East Java.

Background 
Football hooliganism has had a long history in Indonesia, with dozens of supporters killed since the 1990s. Several teams' fan clubs have so-called "commanders", and riot police units are present in many matches, with flares often being used to disperse rioting crowds invading the pitch. In 2018, riots at Kanjuruhan following a match between Malang's Arema and Persib Bandung had resulted in a fatality after riot police employed tear gas to disperse crowds. 

Although FIFA regulation 19b states that tear gas should not be used in stadiums by pitchside stewards or police, it is employed by Indonesian police riot units for securing football matches. FIFA regulations are optional when an association or confederation arranges an event by its own competition regulations. Therefore, the regulations may only serve as guidelines.

Arema and Persebaya Surabaya, longstanding rival clubs as the Super East Java Derby, were scheduled to play a Liga 1 regular season match at Malang's 42,000-capacity Kanjuruhan Stadium on 1 October. Due to security concerns, police had requested that the match be held earlier in the afternoon at  instead of at 20:00 (13:00 UTC), and that only 38,000 people be allowed to spectate; however the request was not accepted by Liga 1 officials and match organisers, and 42,000 tickets were printed. Following police advice, however, tickets to the match were not provided for Persebaya supporters.

The Malang Police Chief had held a phone conversation with the Director of Operations of LIB, Sujarno, who said the match must still be held at night.

Disaster 

Throughout the match itself, the security situation was smooth and without major incidents. Following the end of the match, in which Persebaya defeated Arema 3–2 – Persebaya's first ever win away at Arema, four spectators from stands 9 and 10 entered the field to take photos with Arema players. According to a witness, they were chased by the police, who pulled off their shirts and beat them; this triggered other supporters to enter the field area. Approximately 3,000 supporters of Arema, nicknamed Aremania, invaded the pitch. The first group of spectators who invaded the pitch came from stand 12. They scattered around the pitch looking for their team's players and officials, demanding their explanation of the defeat "after 23 years of undefeated home matches" against its rival Persebaya. Security officials and police tried to divert more Aremania away from the pitch, but to no avail. Then Aremania proceeded to throw objects, damaged police vehicles and start fires in the stadium, forcing Persebaya's players to rush for cover inside locker rooms and then be rushed again into police armoured personnel carriers for an hour before they could leave the stadium. 

After failed "preventive measures", the police began using tear gas in an attempt to disperse the rioters on the pitch. Initially, the police fired tear gas towards stand 12, with stands 10,11, and 14 then targeted, followed by the south and north stands. This affected Aremania invading the pitch and other people there, causing Aremania to run for the single exit point (gates 12–14) to avoid the tear gas. All gates were locked except gate 14, with most victims later found at gates 13 and 14, which resulted in a crowd crush and asphyxiation. Tear gas was also deployed outside the stadium. Listyo claimed 11 shots of tear gas were fired in this disaster (7 shots to south, 1 shot to north and 3 shots to the pitch). while The Washington Post reported that police fired at least 40 rounds of tear gas at the crowd within 10 minutes. The police said that ten police vehicles and three private vehicles were destroyed by the Aremania.

In the immediate aftermath of the riot, the players' lobby and changing rooms were used as makeshift evacuation posts, with Arema players and officials helping to evacuate victims still in the stadium. The victims were taken to hospitals by ambulances and Indonesian Army trucks. Many died on the way to or during treatment.

Casualties 
On 5 October 2022, the Indonesian National Police confirmed 131 deaths from this disaster. This data echoed the previous report of 131 deaths from the Malang Regency Office of Health. Meanwhile, 133 deaths are reported by the Postmortem Crisis Center Post, established by the government of Malang Regency. Aremania disputed the official numbers, alleging that more than 200 people may be killed, as some of the dead bodies are immediately returned to their families instead of being transported to the hospital. Thirty-nine children from ages 3 to 17 are also included in the death toll. The number is expected to increase as some of the treated victims were "deteriorating". As of 18 October 2022, the reported number of casualties is 583 injured and 133 killed. The 135th victim died on 24 October 2022.

The municipal government of Malang paid for the medical treatment of victims. Kepanjen Regional Hospital and Wava Hospital are reported to be full of victims from the disaster, leading to some being sent to other hospitals around the city.

The governor of East Java, Khofifah Indar Parawansa, announced that the government of East Java would provide financial compensation for the victims' relatives. Each next-of-kin of the deceased would receive Rp 10 million (USD ), while the wounded victims would receive Rp 5 million (USD ). On 4 October 2022, Widodo announced the provision of additional financial compensation of Rp 50 million (USD ) from the central government to each deceased's next-of-kin.

The disaster is the second deadliest in the history of association football worldwide, after the 1964 Estadio Nacional disaster in Peru, which killed 328 people.

Ages and genders

Of those who died, 38 were aged under 17. The youngest who died was 3 years old and the oldest was 45 years old.

Aftermath 

As a result of the incident, President Joko Widodo later instructed the association to suspend all Liga 1 matches until all "evaluation of improvement of security procedures" is carried out, followed by joint fact-finding team deciding that all football leagues matches (Liga 1, Liga 2 and Liga 3) were temporarily suspended until the President says it can be normalised. The Indonesian Football Association (PSSI) apologised for the incident and announced a ban on home matches for Arema for the rest of the season. PSSI also stated that the decision to continue to hold the match by PT Liga Indonesia Baru, which is the organiser of the match, had been agreed with other stakeholders of Indonesian football. In addition, Widodo also orders all Liga 1, 2 and 3 stadiums to be fully audited by Minister of Public Works and Public Housing (PUPR) Basuki Hadimuljono.

On 3 October 2022, two days after the incident, the Head of Indonesian police Listyo Sigit Prabowo removed the Head of Police of Malang, Police Adjunct Chief Commissioner Ferli Hidayat, from his duties. Nine officers from East Java Mobile Brigade Corps were also removed.

Also on 3 October 2022, PSSI announced that the 2023 AFC U-17 Asian Cup qualification group B matches, which is held in Indonesia, will be played behind closed doors starting that night.

On 4 October 2022, a police officer was held in custody for 21 days for using the official Twitter account of Bantul's Srandakan police in the Special Region of Yogyakarta, tweeting "Die!", "What are you all supporting for?" and "Salute to soldier! Eradicate!" in response to Indonesian netizens discussing the use of tear gas in the incident.

After the incident, a video showing Indonesian soldiers beating and kicking Arema supporters surfaced. Commander of the Indonesian National Armed Forces Andika Perkasa promised that the act is not considered as self defence, and the soldiers involved would be charged with criminal law.

After his meeting with FIFA President Gianni Infantino on 18 October 2022, Widodo issued orders to deactivate Kanjuruhan Stadium, demolish and rebuild it according to FIFA standards.

On 5 December 2022, the imposed suspension of Liga 1 was lifted, and the competition resumed, with all matches in the rest of the Liga 1 2022–23 first round (game weeks 12 until 17) being held behind closed doors.

Legal 
Following the incident, there were calls from the Institute for Security and Strategic Studies (ISESS), an Indonesian defence and security think tank, and the Indonesian Police Watch (IPW) to dismiss the Malang police chief, Adjunct Chief Commissioner Ferli Hidayat. ISESS also demanded the dismissal of the East Java police chief Inspector General Nico Afinta, while IPW requested Afinta to bring the organisers of the match to trial.

The PSSI Disciplinary Commission imposed a lifetime ban on football activities on the Arema match organising committee chairman, Abdul Haris, and Arema head of security officer, Suko Sutrisno. In addition, Arema was subjected to a Rp 250 million (USD 16,000) fine, and Arema was prohibited from holding matches with spectators as hosts.

Investigation 

The National Commission on Human Rights of Indonesia (KOMNAS HAM) plans to investigate the incident and the use of tear gas by police. Although FIFA's rules say that tear gas should not be used inside stadiums, the chief of regional police defended its use, citing the threats posed by the rioters to players and officials. However, the police also stated that they will evaluate the use of tear gas. Investigators are also examining the role of 18 police officers who operated the tear gas launcher. On 12 October 2022, KOMNAS HAM published their findings.  On 14 October 2022, Narasi, an Indonesian independent news office, released a visual investigation by presenting the sequence of the disaster, highlighting the abuse of tear gas. Narasi compiled more than 80 amateur videos recordings.

Police 
Police investigated CCTV footage at six gates of the Kanjuruhan Stadium on 4 October. Specifically, gates 3 and 9–13 were looked at because of results from a preliminary analysis assessed most of the victims were at those gates.

On 6 October 2022, Head of Indonesian police Listyo Sigit Prabowo announced six accused. Ahmad Hadi Lukita, the director of PT Liga Indonesia Baru, is charged for his negligence of stadium verification. Abdul Haris, Arema match organising committee chairman, is charged for not fulfilling the obligation of creating a set of safety rules or guidelines for spectators, as well as allowing ticket sales above stadium capacity. Suko Sutrisno, Arema head of security officer, is charged for not creating risk assessment document, and ordering gate stewards to leave stadium gates in the wake of the disaster. Three police officers are also charged: Wahyu S. Wahyu, Chief of Operations of Malang Regency Police; Hasdarman, Commander of 3rd Mobile Brigade Company of East Java Police, and Bambang Sidik Achmadi, Head of Prevention Unit of Malang Regency Police. Wahyu is charged for not prohibiting the use of tear gas, despite being aware of its prohibition by FIFA regulations, while Hasdarman and Achmadi are charged for ordering the use of tear gas by their subordinates.

On 10 October 2022, police admitted using expired tear gas. The fact-finding team submitted tear gas samples to National Research and Innovation Agency (BRIN) to analyze tear gas used by police to find possible toxins or other compounds in the tear gas, to determine the compounds causing injury or death of the victims. The tear gas samples originated from three separate Police stockpiles, from Brimob, Samapta Corps, and Malang Regency Police. Due to expired tear gas issue, the parents of two victims who died in the tragedy submitted a request for a re-autopsy on the bodies of their daughters, the father questioning the cause of the death of his two daughters. 

On 15 November 2022, The East Java Police called a doctor from Wava Husada Hospital, Kepanjen, to present evidence against the suspects for violating the Indonesian Criminal Code articles 359 and 360, which deal with causing someone to suffer a serious injury or death caused by negligence, as well as Article 103 Paragraph 1 in conjunction with Article 52 Indonesian Law number 11/2022 on sports, which the charges was announced on 6 October.. Until 15 November 2022, eleven doctors had already been questioned by the police.

Joint fact-finding team 
On 3 October 2022, a joint independent fact-finding team, headed by the Coordinating Minister for Political, Legal, and Security Affairs Mahfud MD and Minister of Youth and Sports Zainudin Amali, was formed. No members of the Football Association of Indonesia (PSSI) joined the fact-finding team. 

On 14 October 2022, the fact-finding team submitted a 124-page final report on the investigation to the president. While the full report is classified, a summary and excerpt of the report was made available. The report put blames six parties involved in the incident: PSSI, LIB, match organizing committee, match security officers, the Police and Indonesian Army, and Arema supporters. From the involved parties, PSSI was blamed by the fact-finding team as major cause of the incident. The fact-finding team assessed that there were eight occurrences of PSSI misconduct, and that the PSSI chairman and executive committee members should resign over the Kanjuruhan disaster. On the other hand, PSSI refuses to do the joint fact-finding team recommendation for PSSI to reshuffle the management through the Extraordinary Congress (KLB). PSSI claimed those are recommendation only. On 28 October 2022, PSSI executive commissioners announced that they will hold an extraordinary congress, after club representatives and members of PSSI invoked Article 34 of the PSSI Statute. 

At the time of the fact-finding team announced the final report, BRIN not yet finished analysis of the tear gas samples and was still assessing the toxicity and performing complete toxin profiling. Nonetheless the BRIN report produced and later submitted as addendum of the fact-finding team's final report, the fact-finding team insisting that the high concentration of the tear gas is the main cause of the injury and death.  On 21 October 2022, the tear gas laboratory analysis results were submitted to TGIPF by BRIN. However, TGIPF through Mahfud MD was hesitant to publish the findings to public. According to Mahfud, TGIPF came to the conclusion that the root cause of the panic that resulted in the deaths of hundreds of people was tear gas. Due to hesitancy of the report release, Aremania held protest on 27 October 2022 demanded many things including release of the BRIN report. On 15 November 2022, TGIPF released statement that the BRIN report is reserved for the investigation and prosecution purposes. The report also submitted for the case submission; thus, the release of the report to public is unlikely.

The fact-finding team also found CCTV footage at Kanjuruhan Stadium which was thought to be deleted, indicating a possible cover-up attempt. The footage came from the main lobby and parking area with a duration of 3 hours 21 minutes.

Autopsies
On 5 November 2022, an independent team from the Indonesian Forensic Doctors Association performed autopsies on the bodies of two disaster victims after they were postponed. The victim's family said that the police had intimidated them. The exhumation of two females, aged 16 and 13, took place at the Sukolilo, Wajak public cemetery.

On 30 November 2022, Indonesian Forensic Doctors Association announced the conclusion of the autopsies in Airlangga University. They stated that the victims' lungs did not contain any tear gas residue. Instead, the two victims' deaths were due to bleeding and fractures of the rib and chest. They also stated that the corpse had decomposed when they took the samples. The victim's lawyer claims that when the victims were found in the disaster, they had blackened faces, foam flowing from their mouths, and were dripping urine.

Trial

The first trial of the disaster was held on 16 January 2023. All the trial procedures, even the reconstruction, were held in Surabaya, East Java. The trial was led by judge  Abu Achmad Sidqi Amsya. The trial was held behind closed doors and was not livestreamed. However, the media crews are able to enter the courtroom which under security procedure.

Result
Only six were accused on the disaster, even though the government through TGIPF promising to add more accused along with the investigation going.

Reactions 
Commission III of the People's Representative Council's deputy chairman, Ahmad Sahroni, condemned the actions of the officers throwing tear gas at the stands, which were filled with people. According to him, the use of tear gas in stadiums is prohibited by FIFA and is not included in the standard operating procedures for securing football matches. Sahroni asked the National Police Chief General Listyo Sigit Prabowo to take firm action against the officers responsible for the use of tear gas.

FIFA 
On 6 October 2022, Widodo sent a letter to FIFA President Gianni Infantino through Minister of State Owned Enterprises Erick Thohir. FIFA replied to the letter on 7 October 2022 as follows:
 No sanction given to Indonesia and Indonesia National Team from FIFA.
 Collaboration between Indonesian government, FIFA, AFC and PSSI will be formed with goals of:
 Establishing stadium security standards for all football stadiums in Indonesia.
 Formulating security protocols and procedures performed by the police to meet international standards.
 Fostering discussions between Indonesian football clubs and supporter representatives to collect input and joint commitments.
 Re-assessing football game schedules and performing risk–benefit analysis.
 Inviting experts for guidance and advising purposes.
 Establishment of a special FIFA office in Indonesia
On 18 October 2022, Infantino met Widodo in Istana Merdeka. In the meeting, the Indonesian government and FIFA agreed to:

 Fix the Indonesian football system, infrastructures, and fan culture.
 Ensure all aspects in Indonesian football competitions will be run under FIFA standards.
 Ensure all aspects in match safety will be run under FIFA standards.
 Re-assess all stadiums worthiness and applying up to date technologies.
 Comprehensively transform Indonesian football standards in accordance with FIFA standards. Assessments of all Indonesian football stakeholders will be jointly performed by the Indonesian government and FIFA.
 Run the 2023 FIFA U-20 World Cup, with Indonesia as the host of the tournament as planned and scheduled. The tournament will be jointly managed by the Indonesian government and FIFA.

International 
 Several football leagues hold a minute's silence to express sympathy for the victims of the tragedy.
 UEFA hold a moment of silence before every UEFA Champions League, UEFA Europa League, and UEFA Europa Conference League matchday three games.
 Malaysian Minister of Youth and Sports Ahmad Faizal Azumu conveyed condolences to family members of victims of the tragedy. He also added that Malaysia is ready to provide any assistance if required by the Indonesian government.
 King Charles III and Queen Camilla expressed their heartfelt condolences to Indonesian people and Indonesian government in aftermath of the disaster.
 German president Frank-Walter Steinmeier wrote a letter to President Joko Widodo expressing his sympathy to the victims of the disaster. Chancellor Olaf Scholz also expressed his condolences to the victims.
 In the UEFA Champions League match between Bayern Munich and Viktoria Plzeň, Bayern's supporters showed a banner that reads "more than 100 people killed by the police! Remember the dead of Kanjuruhan!"
Many European football clubs expressed condolences, including Chelsea, Liverpool, Manchester United, Manchester City, and Barcelona.
Borussia Dortmund's tour to Indonesia was cancelled due to government regulations to improve safety measures. They announced it a month after the disaster.

Police
On 28 October 2022, to provide security for the organizing of sporting events after the Kanjuruhan Stadium disaster, the police issued Chief on the National Police Decree No. 10/2022. The new regulation becomes effective on 4 November 2022. In the new regulation, uses of offensive weapons such as tear gases, smoke grenades, guns in securing the sporting events are forbidden, and police will no longer permitted to carry such weapons in sporting events. As replacement, the police only authorized the use of hand-to-hand martial arts and defensive tools such as riot shield and baton for securing the sporting events. To deter any further pitch invasion events, defensive barricades will be installed in the stadium to separate the team supporters and pitch in all stadiums in Indonesia. The defensive barricades will also be erected in other designated protected areas inside and outside the stadium to ensure the safety of the team supporters, spectators, players, and officials.

Abandoned leagues
Several Provincial Liga 3 (third division; regional leagues) were annulled as a result of noncompliance of National Police Decree No. 10/2022. Per 1 January 2023, East Java and Yogyakarta 2022–2023 Liga 3 season were abandoned.

Following PSSI's exco meeting which took place on 12 January 2023, rest of 2022–23 season of Liga 2 were abandoned. In general, the requests of the clubs, inadequate infrastructure, and police permits prevented the competition from being restarted. There were three statement points announced by PSSI that led to the abandonment of the league:
The majority of Liga 2 clubs (20 of 28 clubs) filed demands to have the competition discontinued. This happened because Liga 2 was very difficult to be restarted due to 2023 U-20 World Cup beginning on 20 May 2023, and there was no alignment in the idea of maintaining the competition between clubs and operators.
Recommendations by the Indonesian football transformation team in regard to the infrastructure and facilities that did not meet standards after the Kanjuruhan tragedy.
In accordance with National Police Decree No. 10/2022, the organizer of a match was required to submit new permits at a specific time and obtain security assistance.
The 2022–23 Liga 1 season continued without relegations because the second tier was abandoned. PSSI also forced PT Liga Indonesia Baru (leagues' operator) to establish new league operator for Liga 2.

PSSI 
In response of the disaster, extraordinary congress is finally invoked and scheduled to be held 16 February 2023. The extraordinary congress will replace the President of PSSI, Vice Presidents of PSSI, and PSSI Executive Committees. 

In compliance with TGIPF recommendation, the President of PSSI, Mochamad Iriawan, confirmed that he will step down from PSSI leadership. He re-affirmed his decision on 15 January 2023. He said that he will no longer pursuing the bid for extending his PSSI presidency, claimed that he was "enough" and he admitted his responsibility for the disaster.

See also

 List of human stampedes and crushes:
 Heysel Stadium disaster – a similar disaster in Belgium in 1985 also caused by rioting football fans
 Hillsborough disaster – a similar disaster in the United Kingdom in 1989 due to police failings rather than supporters' behavior.
 Port Said Stadium riot – a similar disaster in Egypt in 2012 that involved the use of tear gas toward rioting supporters
 2022 Gelora Bandung Lautan Api stampede
 Seoul Halloween crowd crush – a crowd crush in Itaewon, Seoul, South Korea on 29 October at the same year.

Notes

References

External links

 The Kanjuruhan catastrophe: A mirror of Indonesia’s tumultuous football politics by BRIN researcher Aulia Hadi 
 Represifitas Aparat dalam Peristiwa Kanjuruhan: Tanggung Jawab Siapa? by law researcher of University of Indonesia Della Puspita and Enmia Hetty Lorenza T. 
 Ada 14.928 Penonton di Area Terlarang Kanjuruhan  an investigation by Kompas related with bad stadium design 
 Kaleidoscope of Kanjuruhan Disaster  by Tempo Magazine. 

2022 disasters in Indonesia
2022 in Indonesian football
2020s in Java
October 2022 events in Indonesia
Human stampedes in 2022
Association football controversies
Association football riots
Crowd collapses and crushes
Human stampedes in Asia
Man-made disasters in Indonesia
Riots and civil disorder in Indonesia
Stadium disasters
History of East Java
Arema F.C.
Persebaya Surabaya
Controversies in Indonesia
Police brutality in Asia